Fettuccine (fettuccina) is a type of pasta popular in Roman and Tuscan cuisine. It is descended from the extremely thin capelli d'angelo of the Renaissance but is a flat, thick pasta traditionally made of egg and flour (usually one egg for every  of flour). Spinach fettuccine is made from spinach, flour, and eggs.

The terms fettucce and fettuccelle are often used as synonyms for this pasta, but the former term is more precisely used for wider (about ) and the latter for narrower (about ) forms of the same pasta.

Fettuccine is often classically eaten with sugo d'umido (beef ragù) or ragù di pollo (chicken ragù). Dishes made with fettuccine include fettuccine Alfredo, which – born in Rome as a homemade pasta dish topped with an emulsion of butter and grated cheese– evolved in the mid-20th century, achieving significant popularity in the U.S. and becoming a cornerstone of Italian-American cuisine. In 1920, Hollywood stars Douglas Fairbanks and Mary Pickford celebrated their honeymoon in Europe, during which they tasted fettuccine Alfredo at the 'Alfredo alla Scrofa' restaurant on 'Via della Scrofa' in Rome. The dish, very simple but with a unique and genuine flavor, conquered them immediately. Upon their return to the United States, they told everyone about the famous fettuccine and sealed the memory with the gift of a gold fork and spoon, with the dedication "Alfredo, The King of Fettuccine."

Fettuccine is traditionally made fresh (either at home or commercially), but dried fettuccine can also be bought in stores.

References

Bibliography

Cuisine of Lazio
Wide pasta